Khadana is a village panchayat in Anupshahr Tehsil in the district of Bulandshahr in the Indian state of Uttar Pradesh. Its first language is Hindi. It is located 7 km from Jhangirabad on the road to Aahar. In the 2011 census, the village had a population of 3,999

References

Villages in Bulandshahr district